Kalasin is a town (thesaban mueang) in northeast Thailand, the capital of Kalasin Province.

Geography

Climate

References

External links

https://web.archive.org/web/20100731063711/http://www.kalasin-mu.go.th/ Official website

Populated places in Kalasin province
Cities and towns in Thailand
Isan